Florence Nwanzuruahu Nkiru Nwapa (13 January 1931 – 16 October 1993), was a Nigerian author who has been called the mother of modern African Literature. She was the forerunner to a generation of African women writers, and the first African woman novelist to be published in the English language in Britain. She achieved international recognition with her first novel Efuru, published in 1966 by Heinemann Educational Books. While never considering herself a feminist, she was best known for recreating life and traditions from an Igbo woman's viewpoint.

She published African literature and promoted women in African society. She was one of the first African women publishers when she founded Tana Press in Nigeria in 1970. Nwapa engaged in governmental work in reconstruction after the Biafran War; in particular, she worked with orphans and refugees who were displaced during the war.

Biography

Early years and education
Nwapa was born in Oguta, in south-Eastern Nigeria, the eldest of the six children of Christopher Ijeoma (an agent with the United Africa Company) and Martha Nwapa, a teacher of drama. Flora Nwapa attended school in Oguta, Secondary School at Elelenwa in Port Harcourt and CMS Girls School, Lagos, which later moved to Ibadan to merge with Kudeti Girls School and was renamed St Anne's School Ibadan. In 1953, when she was 22 years old, she attended university and in 1957, at the age of 26, earned a B.A. degree from University College, Ibadan. She then went to Scotland, where she earned a Diploma in Education from Edinburgh University in 1958.

Family life
Flora Nwapa had three children: Ejine Nzeribe (from her previous relationship), Uzoma Gogo Nwakuche and Amede Nzeribe. She was married to Chief Gogo Nwakuche.

Her uncle, A. C. Nwapa, was Nigeria's first Minister of Commerce and Industries, according to The House of Nwapa, the documentary by Onyeka Nwelue.

Teaching and public service
After returning to Nigeria, Nwapa joined the Ministry of Education in Calabar as an Education Officer until 1959. She then took employment as a teacher at Queen's School in Enugu, where she taught English and Geography from 1959 to 1962. She continued to work in both education and the civil service in several positions, including as Assistant Registrar, University of Lagos (1962–67). After the Nigerian civil war of 1967–70, she accepted cabinet office as Minister of Health and Social Welfare in East Central State (1970–71), and subsequently as Minister of Lands, Survey and Urban Development (1971–74).  She was a visiting lecturer at Alvan Ikoku Federal College of Education in Owerri, Nigeria. In 1989, she was appointed a visiting professor of creative writing at University of Maiduguri

Writing and publishing
Nwapa's first book, Efuru, was published in 1966 at the age of 30 years and is considered a pioneering work as an English-Language novel by an African woman writer. She sent the transcript to the famous Nigerian author Chinua Achebe in 1962, who replied with a very positive letter and even included money for the postage to mail the manuscript to the English publisher, Heinemann.

Nwapa followed Efuru with the novels such as Idu (1970), Never Again (1975), One is Enough (1981), and Women are Different (1986). She published two collections of storiesThis is Lagos (1971) and Wives at War (1980)and the volume of poems, Cassava Song and Rice Song (1986). She is also the author of several books for children.

In the year 1974, she founded Tana Press, and in 1977 the Flora Nwapa Company, publishing her own adult and children's literature as well as works by other writers. She gave as one of her objectives: "to inform and educate women all over the world, especially Feminists (both with capital F and small f) about the role of women in Nigeria, their economic independence, their relationship with their husbands and children, their traditional beliefs and their status in the community as a whole". Tana has been described as "the first press run by a woman and targeted at a large female audience. A project far beyond its time at a period when no one saw African women as constituting a community of readers or a book-buying demographic."

At the beginning of Nwapa's literary career, as a result of the way feminism was viewed and the way it was portrayed, she had no interest in feminism because she felt it was prejudiced against men but she eventually came to terms with it. However, her struggle with feminism is representative of the present conversations about the movement in Africa and the world at large.

Her work was anthologized in publications ranging from Présence Africaine and Black Orpheus in the 1960s and '70s to Daughters of Africa in 1992.

Later years
Nwapa's career as an educator continued throughout her life and encompassed teaching at colleges and universities internationally, including at New York University, Trinity College, the University of Minnesota, the University of Michigan and the University of Ilorin. She said in an interview with Contemporary Authors, "I have been writing for nearly thirty years. My interest has been on both the rural and the urban woman in her quest for survival in a fast-changing world dominated by men."

Flora Nwapa died of pneumonia on 16 October 1993 at a hospital in Enugu, Nigeria, at the age of 62. Her final novel, The Lake Goddess, was posthumously published.

Selected bibliography
Novels
Efuru, Heinemann Educational Books, 1966; Waveland Press, 2013, 
Idu, Heinemann African Writers Series, No. 56, ; 1970
Never Again, Enugu: Tana Press, 1975; Nwamife, 1976; Africa World Press, 1992, 
One Is Enough, Enugu: Flora Nwapa Co., 1981; Tana Press, 1984; Africa World Press, 1992, 
Women are Different, Enugu: Tana Press, 1986; Africa World Press, 1992, 
The Lake Goddess, Lawrenceville, NJ: Africa World Press, 1995

Short stories/poems
This Is Lagos and Other Stories, Enugu: Nwamife, 1971; Africa World Press, 1992, 
Wives at War and Other Stories, Enugu: Nwamife, 1980; Flora Nwapa Co./Tana Press, 1984; Africa World Press, 1992, 
Cassava Song and Rice Song, Enugu: Tana Press, 1986

Children's books
Emeka, Driver's Guard, London: University of London Press, 1972; Enugu: Flora Nwapa Company, 1987
Mammywater, 1979; Enugu: Flora Nwapa Company, 1984
The Adventures of Deke, Enugu: Flora Nwapa Co., 1980
The Miracle Kittens, Enugu: Flora Nwapa Company, 1980
Journey to Space, Enugu: Flora Nwapa Company, 1980

Legacy
Flora Nwapa is the subject of a documentary entitled The House of Nwapa, made by Onyeka Nwelue, that premiered in August 2016.

On 13 January 2017, Nwapa's birthday was marked with a Google Doodle.

Flora Nwapa's son, Uzoma Gogo Nwakuche, founded the Flora Nwapa Foundation, a California non-profit corporation in 1994 following the death of his mother in 1993. The Flora Nwapa Foundation celebrated Efuru@50 in 2016.

See also 
 Buchi Emecheta
 Margaret Busby

References

Further reading

Adeniyi, Idowu Emmanuel. "Male Other, Female Self and Post-feminist Consciousness in Sembène Ousmane’s God’s Bits of Wood and Flora Nwapa’s Efuru." Ibadan Journal of English Studies 7 (2019):57-72.
 Curry, Ginette. Awakening African Women: The Dynamics of Change. Cambridge Scholars Press, London. 4 January 2004. . 
Adeola, James (ed.), In Their Own Voices, African Women Writers Talk, Portsmouth, NH: Heinemann, 1990.
Andrade, Susan Z., "Rewriting History, Motherhood and Rebellion", Research in African Literatures 21. (1990): 91-110.
Ezeigbo, Theodora Akachi, "Traditional Women’s Institutions in Igbo Society: Implications for the Igbo Female Writer", Languages and Cultures 3. (1990): 149–65.
Githaiga, Anna, Notes on Flora Nwapa's "Efuru", Nairobi: Heinemann Educational Books, 1979.
Ikonne, Chidi, "The Society and Woman’s Quest for Selfhood in Flora Nwapa’s Early Novels". Kunapipi 6. (1984): 68–78.
Nzegwu, Femi, Love, Motherhood and the African Heritage: The Legacy of Flora Nwapa, African Renaissance Foundation (paperback 2003), 
Ogunyemi, Chikwenye Okonjo, Africa Wo/Man Palava, Chicago: University of Chicago Press, 1996.
Umeh, Marie, Emerging Perspectives on Flora Nwapa: Critical and Theoretical Essays, Africa World Press (1998), 
Wilentz, Gay, Binding Cultures, Black Women Writers in Africa and the Diaspora, Bloomington: Indiana University Press, 1992.

External links
 "Flora Nwapa (1931–1993)", Authors' Calendar.
 "Efuru Turns 50: 6 Writers Visit Select Pages from Flora Nwapa's Debut Novel", The Republic, 23 February 2017.
 "Forfatterinne i dag: Flora Nwapa". A 1987 Norwegian TV documentary providing insight into Flora Nwapa's family life.

20th-century American women writers
20th-century Nigerian educators
20th-century Nigerian novelists
20th-century Nigerian women writers
20th-century women educators
1931 births
1993 deaths
Alumni of the University of Edinburgh
American children's writers
American women academics
American women children's writers
Book publishers (people)
Deaths from pneumonia in Nigeria
English-language writers from Nigeria
Igbo academics
Igbo educators
Igbo novelists
Igbo women writers
International Writing Program alumni
New York University faculty
Nigerian expatriate academics in the United States
Nigerian publishers (people)
Nigerian schoolteachers
Nigerian women academics
Nigerian women novelists
History of women in Nigeria
People from Imo State
St Anne's School, Ibadan alumni
University of Ibadan alumni
Academic staff of the University of Ilorin
Academic staff of the University of Lagos
University of Michigan faculty
University of Minnesota faculty